Soyuz TM-13 was the 13th expedition to Mir space station. Lasting from October 1991 to March 1992, the mission included cosmonauts from Austria and the soon-to-be independent region of Kazakhstan, as the Soviet Union collapsed in December 1991. The launch ceremony at the Baikonur Cosmodrome in Baikonur, Kazakh SSR  was attended by the Soviet Premier Ivan Silaev, the President of the Kazakh SSR Nursultan Nazarbayev, and the Chancellor of Austria Franz Vranitzky. Before the launch, for the first time, President Nazarbayev received the launch report from cosmonaut Tokhtar Aubakirov in the Kazakh language.

Crew

Mission highlights 
Soyuz-TM 13 carried commander Alexander Volkov along with Austrian cosmonaut-researcher Franz Viehböck and Soviet-Kazakh cosmonaut-researcher Toktar Aubakirov. The flight was unusual for carrying no flight engineer. Veteran Russian cosmonaut Alexandr Volkov commanded. The Austrians paid $7 million to fly Viehböck to Mir, and the Kazakh cosmonaut flew partly in an effort to encourage the then-Kazakh SSR to continue to permit launchings from Baikonur Cosmodrome. The cosmonaut-researchers photographed their respective countries from orbit and conducted the usual range of materials processing and medical experiments. Artsebarsky and Viehböck returned to Earth in Soyuz TM-12, with Volkov remaining on board Mir for an extended mission.

The Soyuz spent a total of 175 days docked to the Mir space station.

The Soyuz returned from Mir with German Klaus-Dietrich Flade and Krikalev and Volkov, dubbed by some as "the last citizens of the USSR" because they had launched from the Kazakh Soviet Socialist Republic within the USSR, and landed in what had since become the independent Republic of Kazakhstan.

In popular culture
Out of the Present, a 1995 film documentary focused on Soyuz TM-12 cosmonaut Sergei Krikalev's stay on Mir, features the arrival of Soyuz TM-13.

See also 

 Timeline of astronauts by nationality
 List of astronauts by name

Notes and references

External links 
 Franz Viehböck site
 Project AUSTROMIR 91 site
 Spacefacts biography of Franz Viehböck
 Official agreement on the flight

Crewed Soyuz missions
1991 in the Soviet Union
Spacecraft launched in 1991
Austria–Soviet Union relations
Space program of Austria